was a Japanese artist, considered to be one of the founding artists and pioneers of anime. Little is known of his early personal life, other than that his family moved to the Tokyo area when he was nine years old. Here he began working for Tokyo Puck magazine as a political cartoonist and manga series artist.

At the age of 26, Shimokawa was hired by Tenkatsu Production Company to create a short animated film. Shimokawa used several animation techniques that were, at the time, unique: using chalk or white wax on a dark board background to draw characters, rubbing out portions to be animated and drawing with ink directly onto film, whiting out animated portions. At the time, celluloid cels (rather than modern acetate film) were costly and scarce in Japan, having to be imported. These techniques cut production costs, material costs and completion time.

The resulting film was Imokawa Mukuzo Genkanban no Maki, released in 1917. Though not the earliest animation created in Japan, it is considered to be the first "true" Anime film, as it was the first to be publicly shown in a theater. The film ran only five minutes. As with many animation works created in Japan before the mid-1920s, no trace of the film, or any of Shimokawa's five other short films, has survived.

Shimokawa's animation work was cut short by chronic health problems, and he returned to work as a consultant and editor for other production companies making animated films in the 1930s and 1940s. Not much is known of his later life; indeed, very few works bear mention of his contribution beyond his own personal works.

Works
 Imokawa Mukuzo Genkanban no Maki (1917)
 Dekobō shingachō – Meian no shippai (1917)
 Chamebō shingachō – Nomi fūfu shikaeshi no maki (1917)
 Imokawa Mukuzō Chūgaeri no maki (1917)
 Imokawa Mukuzō Tsuri no maki (1917)

References

Sources
 Jonathan Clements, Helen McCarthy (2001). The Anime Encyclopedia: A Guide to Japanese Animation Since 1917, Paperback Edition, Stone Bridge Press.

External links 
 

1892 births
1973 deaths
Japanese animators
Manga artists
People from Miyakojima, Okinawa
Place of birth missing